David Velastegui (born April 1, 1991) is a Canadian professional soccer player who plays for Blue Devils FC in League1 Ontario.

Club career
Velastegui signed with Brampton United in the Canadian Soccer League (CSL), he was a regular starter playing in all 23 match fixtures and being recognized as one of the top young talents of the league. David spent four years at Sheridan College, where he captained the team to win its first ever Canadian National Championship and received the CCAA All-Canadian award, being recognized as the top player in the country. In 2013, he joined Club Sport Colombia in the Paraguayan second tier for a short period, leaving the club due to the club’s limited financial resources and returning to Sheridan. While his time at Sheridan during the off season he continued playing in the Canadian Soccer League with Toronto Croatia where they were CSL Championship finalists in 2014.

Velastegui was then signed by San Cristóbal in the Liga Dominicana de Fútbol. David quickly made an impact scoring on his debut and lead his team in goals becoming 4th overall Top Goalscorer of the league with 7 goals. He was signed mid-season by another Dominican team, Delfines del Este FC and scored in his club debut against Cibao FC on May 13, 2016. 

In 2019, he played with Vaughan Azzurri in League1 Ontario, and for the remainder of the season returned to the CSL to play with FC Ukraine United. He also featured in the 2019 Canadian Championship against HFX Wanderers FC. During his tenure with Ukraine United he featured in the CSL Championship final once more against Scarborough SC. In 2020, he returned to his former Dominican club San Cristóbal.

Velastegui signed for MASL club Mississauga MetroStars ahead of their inaugural season. 

In 2021, he began the season playing for Scrosoppi FC in League1 Ontario, before switching to Blue Devils FC in the same league in September, where he remained for 2022.

International career
David was 15 years old when he made his debut in the Canadian youth program in 2006 in a pair of friendlies against the United States youth U-15 national team and IMG Academy under coach Sean Fleming in Bradenton, Florida.

References

External links
 

1991 births
Living people
Association football midfielders
Canadian soccer players
Soccer players from Mississauga
Canadian people of Ecuadorian descent
Sportspeople of Ecuadorian descent
Canadian expatriate soccer players
Expatriate footballers in the Dominican Republic
Canadian expatriate sportspeople in the Dominican Republic
Brampton United players
Toronto Croatia players
Mississauga MetroStars players
FC Ukraine United players
Canadian Soccer League (1998–present) players
League1 Ontario players
Major Arena Soccer League players
Liga Dominicana de Fútbol players
CA San Cristóbal players
Vaughan Azzurri players
Sigma FC players
Blue Devils FC players
Scrosoppi FC players
Canadian expatriate sportspeople in Paraguay
Expatriate footballers in Paraguay